Kevin Michael Griffin (born October 1, 1968)  is an American singer, songwriter, and record producer. He is best known as the lead vocalist of the rock band Better Than Ezra.

His songs have been performed and recorded by artists such as Taylor Swift, Train, Sugarland, James Blunt, Dierks Bentley, The Record Company, Wilder Wood, Moon Taxi, Saint Motel, Andy Grammer, Christina Perri, Trombone Shorty, Howie Day, Barenaked Ladies, Tom Morello, Boys Like Girls, Blondie, Chase Rice, The Struts, Andrew McMahon, Matt Nathanson, Meat Loaf, Missy Higgins, and many others.

Griffin also works in music publishing, artist management, and lectures internationally on the subject of creativity to companies and organizations such as Live Nation, Which Wich?, Novation, and YPO-WPO. His first book is slated to be released in the fall of 2022.

He is a co-founder and partner of the Pilgrimage Music & Cultural Festival in Franklin, Tennessee. Rolling Stones review of the festival's inaugural year was positive, saying it had "an A-list lineup (arguably the best curated of the year)"  and "established itself as a festival to watch." Performers at the festival have included Justin Timberlake, Foo Fighters, Willie Nelson, Chris Stapleton, The Killers, Dave Matthews Band, Maren Morris, The Black Keys, Cage the Elephant, and Black Pumas.

Griffin formed the alternative rock band Better Than Ezra in 1988. They had platinum success in the 1990s with hits such as "Good", "In the Blood", and "Desperately Wanting", and have continued in the 2000s with hits such as "Extra Ordinary", "A Lifetime", and "Juicy". The band continues to tour and produce new recordings, the most recent of which is All Together Now, released in September 2014. As a performer, Griffin is known for singing in falsetto, inviting audience members onstage to play guitar, and interrupting his own songs with verses of well-known rock songs. He is also a mimic, imitating singers such as Aaron Neville, Bruce Springsteen, and Dave Matthews.

His first solo album, Anywhere You Go, was released on October 4, 2019. Griffin also performs as part of Ezra Ray Hart with Mark McGrath of Sugar Ray and Emerson Hart of Tonic.

Personal life
Griffin was born in Atlanta, Georgia, and grew up in Monroe, Louisiana. He attended River Oaks School, where he met his bandmate Jim Payne. He received a bachelor's degree in English and a minor in political science from Louisiana State University in 1990. He was a member of the Kappa Sigma Fraternity. He took the LSAT with the intention of attending law school and working in entertainment law. He then took a job with Creative Artists Agency in Los Angeles during the early 1990s, before Better Than Ezra achieved commercial success.

Griffin and his family largely resided in the Uptown neighborhood of New Orleans until Hurricane Katrina devastated the city in 2005. He purchased a home in the Silver Lake neighborhood of Los Angeles in July 2006 and in 2011, he sold his house and moved to Franklin, Tennessee, with his family.

Career
Griffin has produced, written, and co-written platinum albums and songs that have sold more than thirty million copies.

He has had eleven songs in the Top 40 charts, and his songs have been streamed more than a billion times.

Griffin's first number-one with Better Than Ezra was the 1995 song "Good", and it stayed on top of the Alternative Chart for seven weeks. It reached No. 1 on the Billboard Modern Rock Tracks chart, No. 3 on the Billboard Mainstream Rock Tracks chart, and No. 30 on the Billboard Hot 100.

His other number-one songs are Howie Day's "Collide" and Sugarland's "Stuck Like Glue" in 2011, which became the eleventh most-downloaded song in country music history.

In 2010, his song "Breathless" was covered by Taylor Swift at the Hope for Haiti telethon, the most widely distributed telethon in history.

Griffin has won numerous BMI pop and country awards, and his song "Scar", with Missy Higgins, won Song of the Year at the Australian ARIA Awards.

In 2018, he was an adjunct professor at NYU's Clive Davis School of Recorded Music. Currently, he serves on the GRAMMY's Songwriter and Composer Wing Committee.

As a music publisher, Griffin has co-published Florida Georgia Line's No. 1 song "May We All" and Morgan Wallen's No. 1 "Chasin' You".

He is active with Better Than Ezra's foundation, MusiCares, and St. Jude. In 2020, through a series of livestream acoustic performances, he was able to raise more than $220K for various charities helping those adversely affected by the COVID-19 pandemic.

Songwriting credits

References

External links
 MySpace page

1966 births
American alternative rock musicians
APRA Award winners
Better Than Ezra members
American male singers
American rock singers
Living people
Musicians from New Orleans
Louisiana State University alumni
American rock songwriters
American male songwriters
Place of birth missing (living people)
Alternative rock singers